Until 2020 the Central and Eastern Europe (CEE) Stock Exchange Group (CEESEG) was a holding company comprising the stock exchanges of Vienna and Prague. The holding company was the strategic and financial leader and also responsible for the administration of the equity interests, while the day-to-day operation of the exchanges were taken care of locally by the two subsidiaries. In 2020 the Vienna Stock Exchange decided to simplify its group structure. In order to reduce expenses and costs, Wiener Börse AG merged with the former group holding company CEESEG AG. The Prague Stock Exchange is now a 99.54% subsidiary of Wiener Börse AG. 

The CEESEG emerged as the outcome of a series of acquisitions of Central European stock exchanges by the Vienna Stock Exchange after the fall of the Iron Curtain. In addition to the investees under the umbrella of the holding company, the Vienna Stock Exchange also built up a network of cooperation exchanges in the region of Central and Southeast Europe.  The cooperative ventures are mainly in the area of IT (shared trading system), the dissemination of exchange data and the calculation of exchange indices. These synergy effects and the common brand make it possible for the local markets to network with international customers better.

See also
 Wiener Börse (Vienna Stock Exchange)
 Prague Stock Exchange

External links
 Press release: Vienna Stock Exchange simplifies group structure
 Webpage of Vienna Stock Exchange
 Webpage of Prague Stock Exchange
Press release: CEESEG sells stake in Ljubljana Stock Exchange
Press release: CEESEG and OeKB sell stakes in Budapest Stock Exchange

Stock exchanges in Europe
Financial services companies established in 2010